The Mount Morris Dam is a concrete dam on the Genesee River.  It is located south of Rochester, New York in the towns of Leicester and Mount Morris in Livingston County, New York, next to Letchworth State Park.

History
The Mt. Morris Dam was built between 1948 and 1952 by the Buffalo District office of the U.S. Army Corps of Engineers (USACE).  The project was authorized by the United States Congress in the Flood Control Act of 1944 at a cost of $25 million.

Prior to the construction of the dam, the Genesee River Valley and the city of Rochester had experienced periodic flooding. Severe floods occurred every seven years on average between 1865 and 1950. Prior projects in Rochester, including retaining walls and a deepening of the river, were insufficient to stop a major flood event.

The USACE states that, in the years since the completion of the dam, an estimated $1 billion in flooding damages have been prevented. In June of 1972, Hurricane Agnes passed over the Genesee Valley, causing over 7 inches of rain to fall across the entire valley in a short period of time. The water inflow due to Hurricane Agnes exceeded the storage capacity of the reservoir and it was necessary to release water through the gates of the dam, causing minor downstream flooding. These releases were made to prevent overtopping of the spillway. Had the spillway overtopped, accumulated debris in the reservoir would have passed downstream, causing log jams and additional damage. Inflows of this magnitude are only expected to happen an average of every 300 years. An estimated $210 million in damages was prevented by the dam during the storm.

Commemorations
June 2002 commemorated the 50th anniversary of the completion of Mount Morris Dam. A celebration and dedication of the commemorative kiosk was held to honor and recognize the men and women employed by the U.S. Army Corps of Engineers, Buffalo District and Mount Morris Dam Builders, 1948-1952. The kiosk rests on a foundation of bricks, each of which is inscribed with the name and occupation of the builders.

Visiting Centers
The William B. Hoyt II Visitor Center at Mount Morris Dam, opened by the U.S. Army Corps of Engineers in 1999, was built to accommodate the thousands of people who visit the dam each year. This  center features a large atrium, museum, theater and public restroom facilities.

Project facts
General
Distance from mouth of Genesee River: .
Drainage area above dam: . 
Drainage area below dam: .

Dam
Type: Concrete Gravity/Dry. 
Total length:  .
Top width: .
Maximum height above river bed:  .

Spillway
Total length:  .
Crest elevation:  .

Reservoir 
Length in River Miles:   at Maximum flood control pool. 
Storage Volume:   at Maximum flood control pool.

Outlet Works
Type:  Rectangular conduits. 
Location:  Base of spillway.

See also
List of reservoirs and dams in New York

References

External links

Mount Morris Dam and Recreational Area - official site
Mt. Morris Dam construction photo
NYS Parks - Letchworth State Park
Real-time Genesee River data
Pieces of the Past: Artifacts, Documents, and Primary Sources from Letchworth Park History

Dams in New York (state)
Reservoirs in New York (state)
Landmarks in New York (state)
Genesee River
Buildings and structures in Livingston County, New York
Museums in Livingston County, New York
Tourist attractions in Livingston County, New York
Protected areas of Livingston County, New York
United States Army Corps of Engineers dams
Dams completed in 1952
Reservoirs in Livingston County, New York
Gravity dams